The Olympus Zuiko Digital 17.5-45mm F3.5-5.6 is an interchangeable camera lens announced by Olympus Corporation on September 26, 2005.

References

External links
 

Camera lenses introduced in 2005
017.5-045mm 1:3.5-5.6